Miloš Kratochvíl (born 26 April 1996) is a Czech footballer who plays for Jablonec as a midfielder.

Career

Senica
Kratochvíl made his professional debut for Senica  against Slovan Bratislava on 17 July 2016.

Career statistics

Club

References

External links
 Eurofotbal profile
  
 Futbalnet Profile
 Profile at FAČR official site

1995 births
Living people
Czech footballers
Association football midfielders
FC Zbrojovka Brno players
FC Viktoria Plzeň players
FK Baník Sokolov players
FK Senica players
Slovak Super Liga players
Expatriate footballers in Slovakia
Czech expatriate sportspeople in Slovakia
FK Jablonec players
Czech Republic youth international footballers
Czech Republic under-21 international footballers
Sportspeople from Karlovy Vary